Antonio Skármeta (born Esteban Antonio Skármeta Vranicic on November 7, 1940) is a Chilean writer, scriptwriter and director descending from Croatian immigrants from the Adriatic island of Brač, Dalmatia. He was awarded Chile's National Literature Prize in 2014.

Biography and career

Skármeta studied at Colegio San Luis of Antofagasta and at Instituto Nacional General José Miguel Carrera, a prestigious public high school of  Santiago.

His 1985 novel and film Ardiente paciencia ("Burning Patience") inspired the 1994 Academy Award-winning movie, Il Postino (The Postman). Passionate about cinema, Skármeta has written several scripts and directed at least two films. Subsequent editions of the book bore the title El cartero de Neruda (Neruda's Postman). His fiction has since received dozens of awards and has been translated into nearly thirty languages worldwide.

Skármeta studied philosophy and literature both in Chile and at Columbia University in New York. From 1967 to 1973, the year he left Chile (first to Buenos Aires and later to West Berlin), he taught literature at the University of Chile.

In 1987, he was a member of the jury at the 37th Berlin International Film Festival.

In 1989, after the end of Pinochet’s military dictatorship, the writer returned to Chile in order "to create political space for freedom".  He hosted a television program on literature and the arts, which regularly attracted over a million viewers.

From 2000 to 2003 he served as the Chilean ambassador in Germany.

He teaches classes at Colorado College both in Santiago, and Colorado Springs.

In 2011 his novel Los días del arco iris won the prestigious Premio Iberoamericano Planeta-Casa de América de Narrativa, one of the richest literary prizes in the world worth $200,000.

His unpublished play El Plebiscito was the basis of Pablo Larraín's successful drama film No.

His 2010 novel Un padre de película was the basis of O Filme da Minha Vida, a Brazilian film released in 2017. Skármeta himself suggested the project to Brazilian director and actor Selton Mello.

Works
 El entusiasmo, 1967.
 Desnudo en el tejado, 1969.
 Tiro  libre, 1973.
 Soñé que la nieve ardía, 1975.
 Novios solitarios, 1975.
 No paso nada, 1980.
 La insurrección, 1982.
 Ardiente paciencia, 1985.
 El cartero de Neruda, 1985.
 Matchball, 1989.
 La composición, 1998.
 La boda del poeta, 1999.
 La chica del trombón, 2001.
 El baile  de la Victoria, 2003.
 Los días del arco iris, 2010.
 Libertad de Movimiento, 2016.

References

Further reading

External links

Antonio Skármeta (literaturfestival.com)
 

1940 births
Living people
Ambassadors of Chile to Germany
20th-century Chilean novelists
20th-century Chilean male writers
Chilean male novelists
Chilean people of Croatian descent
People from Antofagasta
Prix Médicis étranger winners
Columbia University alumni
Colorado College faculty
21st-century Chilean novelists
21st-century Chilean male writers